John Watson Foster Dulles  (May 20, 1913 – June 23, 2008) was an American scholar of Brazilian history.

Biography 
Born in Auburn, New York, on May 20, 1913, John W.F. Dulles was the son of the former Secretary of State of the United States of America, John Foster Dulles. In 1935 he graduated in philosophy from Princeton University. He received a master's degree in business administration from Harvard University in 1937 and then joined the Bank of New York, where his father was a director.

He worked in a New York mining company where he was sent to Arizona where he received a bachelor's degree in metallurgy from the University of Arizona's School of Mines and Metallurgy in 1943.

In 1959 he moved to Rio de Janeiro, Brazil, to fix an unprofitable Hanna Mining Co. gold mine in the country. The task proved too difficult due to the political turbulence in Brazil at the time, so in 1962 he moved  to Texas to become a professor of Latin American studies at the University of Texas.

His first book, published in 1962, Yesterday in Mexico: A Chronicle of the Revolution, 1919–1936, was the result of conversations with the Mexican president Adolfo Ruiz Cortines. Later on he dedicated himself to the study of Brazilian history, starting with the study about former president Getúlio Vargas, entitled Vargas of Brazil: a political biography in 1967.

His works were criticized for having too much description and too little analysis, as well as for not mentioning his part and of his company in the political articulations during the João Goulart government.

He died on June 23, 2008, at North Central Baptist Hospital in San Antonio, Texas. His cause of death was kidney failure.

Works 

 Yesterday in Mexico: A Chronicle of the Revolution, 1919–1936 – 1962
 Vargas of Brazil: a political biography – 1967
 Anarchists and communists in Brazil, 1900–1935 – 1973
 Unrest in Brazil: political military crisis, 1955–1964 – 1980
 President Castello Branco: the making of a Brazilian president – 1978
 President Castello Branco: a Brazilian reformer – 1980
 Brazilian communism: repression during world upheaval, 1935–1945 – 1983
 A Faculdade de Direito e a resistência anti-Vargas, 1938–1945 – 1984
 Carlos Lacerda, Brazilian cruzader – 1991
 Castello Branco: o caminho para a presidência – 1979
 Carlos Lacerda, Brazilian cruzader: the years 1960–1977 – 1996
 Sobral Pinto, a consciência do Brasil: a cruzada contra o regime Vargas (1930–1945) – 2001
 Resisting Brazil's military regime: an account of the battles of Sobral Pinto – 2007

References

External links 
 John W. F. Dulles Interview, Pursue The Passion, 8 October 2007.

1913 births
2008 deaths
People from Auburn, New York
Princeton University alumni
20th-century American historians
American male non-fiction writers
University of Texas at Austin faculty
Harvard Business School alumni
Historians from New York (state)
Brazilianists
20th-century American male writers